The following list consists of notable concepts that are derived from Islamic and associated cultural (Arab, Persian, Turkish) traditions, which are expressed as words in Arabic or Persian language. The main purpose of this list is to disambiguate multiple spellings, to make note of spellings no longer in use for these concepts, to define the concept in one or two lines, to make it easy for one to find and pin down specific concepts, and to provide a guide to unique concepts of Islam all in one place.

Separating concepts in Islam from concepts specific to Arab culture, or from the language itself, can be difficult. Many Arabic concepts have an Arabic secular meaning as well as an Islamic meaning. One example is the concept of dawah. Arabic, like all languages, contains words whose meanings differ across various contexts.

Arabic is written in its own alphabet, with letters, symbols, and orthographic conventions that do not have exact equivalents in the Latin alphabet (see Arabic alphabet). The following list contains transliterations of Arabic terms and phrases; variations exist, e.g. din instead of deen and aqidah instead of aqeedah. Most items in the list also contain their actual Arabic spelling.



A

 (for male)  (for female)
 Servant or worshipper. Muslims consider themselves servants and worshippers of God as per Islam. Common Muslim names such as Abdullah (Servant of God), Abdul-Malik (Servant of the King), Abdur-Rahmān (Slave of the Most Beneficent), Abdus-Salām (Slave of [the originator of] Peace), Abdur-Rahîm (Slave of the Most Merciful), all refer to names of Allah.

 ʾAdab  Traditionally describes good manners, as in etiquette. For example, being courteous is good ʾadab. However, the term can be used very broadly, and the proper translation would be "the proper way to go about something," as in the example, ʾĀdāb al Qitāl, or, "The Proper Ways of Fighting in War," (Qitāl in Arabic means mortal combat) in which the word "etiquette" does not befit the context. A secondary meaning of ʾAdab is "literature".
 ʾAdhān  call to salat (prayer), sometimes alternatively spelled and pronounced Azaan, Athaan and Adhan.
 ʿAdl  justice, especially distributive justice: social, economic, political, proprietary.
 AH Anno Hegirae The Islamic calendar starts counting years starting from the time when Muhammad had to leave Mecca and go to Medina, an event known as the Hijra. The first day of the first Islamic year is 1 Muḥarram 1 (AH) and corresponds to 16 July 622 (CE).
 ʾAḥad literally "one." Islamically, ahad means One Alone, unique, none like God. Al-Ahad is one of the names of God.
 ʾAḥkām These are rulings and orders of the Qu'ran and Sunnah. A single ruling is called a Ḥukm. Five kinds of orders: Wajib or Fard (obligatory), Mustahab (preferred and recommended), Halal or Mubah (permissible), Makruh (disliked and not recommended), and Haram (forbidden)
 ʾAhl al-Bayt members of Muhammad's Household. Also known among Shia as the Maʿṣūmūn (infallibles; spiritually pure).
 ʾAhl al-Fatrah people who live in ignorance of the teachings of a revealed religion, but according to the "Fitra", the "Natural Religion" innate to human nature as created by God.
 ʾAhl al-Kitāb  "People of the Book", or followers of pre-Islamic monotheistic religions with some form of scripture believed to be of divine origin which were mentioned in Quran: Jews, Christians.
 ʾĀkhirah  hereafter or eternal life
 ʾAkhlāq  The practice of virtue. Morals.
 Al-ʾIkhlāṣ  Sincerity and genuineness in religious beliefs.
 Al-Bir  Piety and righteousness and every act of obedience to Allah.
   Literally "worlds", humankind, jinn, angels and all that exists.
 Al Hijr (Kaaba) A semi-circular wall north-west of Kaaba.
 ʿalayhi -s-salām  "Peace be upon him" This expression normally follows after naming a prophet (other than Muhammad), or one of the noble Angels (i.e. Jibreel (Gabriel), Meekaal (Michael), etc.)
   "Praise be to God!" Qur'anic exclamation and also same meaning as hallelujah.
 Allāh The name of God according to Islam. Also used as the Arabic word for God in general.
 Allāhumma "O Allah, my Lord" - used in a phrase or salutation, invocations or supplications (dua).
 Allāhu ʾAkbar  "Allah is [the] greatest". Greater than anything or anyone, imaginable or unimaginable.
   lit. One who knows. A scholar (in any field of knowledge) ; a jurist or scientist (who knows science) or a theologian (who knows religion); similar to Japanese sensei, "teacher".
 Amān, lit. 'safety, protection, safe conduct'
 ʾAmānah the trust. Of all creation, only human beings & jinns carry the "trust", which is free will.
 ʾĀmīn Amen.
   "Commander of the Faithful" Historically the title of the Caliph.
 ʾĀminah  Muhammad's mother. Aminah fell sick and died in Abwa, near Madina (then Yathrib) when Muhammad was six years old.
 Al-ʾAmr Bi'l Maʿrūf  Islamic doctrine of enjoining right. There exists in Islam the (obligatory) principle of encouraging other people to do the right thing.
 ʾAnfāl Spoils of war. (See Sūrat al-ʾAnfāl (8:1))
  "Helpers." The Muslim converts at Medina who helped the Muslims from Mecca after the Hijrah.
   Article of faith, tenet, creed, or dogma.
   Islamic practice of shaving the head of the newborn male and contributing the weight in silver for charity as well as 2 lambs.
  Intelligence, intellect, mind, understanding
 ʾArkān singular rukn  The five rukn "pillars" of Islam. (See rukn)
 A.S. (ʿAlayhi s-salām) This acronym evokes a blessing and is appended to the names of the prophets who came before Muhammad. It will also be applied to the mothers of those prophets. When following a woman's name, the feminine form is ʿAlayha s-salām.
 aṣaḥḥ Arabic elative term, “more correct.” Used by Muslim scholars to introduce their own view while not entirely dismissing that of others.
 ʾAṣl (pl. ʾuṣūl)  Root, origin, source; principle.
 ʾaslim taslam "Submit to Islam" (See dawah)
  List of God's 99 names. According to a hadith, the one who enumerates them all will enter Paradise.
  The third salat prayer. The time of the day before sunset and after noon. Also means "era".
   The bridge by crossing which it is determined (judged) whether a person would go to heaven or hell. How a person crosses the Sirat depends on what they have done in their life and what they have believed in.
 al-ʿAsharatu Mubashsharun bil-Jannah or just ʿAsharatu Mubashsharah ( or ) The ten companions of Muhammad who were promised paradise (only in Sunni Islam)
   Tenth day of the month of Muharram. It is the day God saved Moses and the children of Israel from the Pharaoh. The grandson of Muhammad, Imam Hussayn sacrificed his life along with 72 of his companions on the sand dunes of Karbala. Sunni Scholars recommended to fast during this day. To the Shias, it is also a day on which they mourn the death of the third Shia Imam, Husayn ibn Ali, along with his family and companions, who were killed in the famous battle in Karbala. They cry and weep and organize lamentating programmes where they not only learn how to live a proper Islamic life and improve their Spiritual Self but also cry at the end of the ritual to show their true love and faith towards imam Hussayn.
  (السلام عليكم) The Islamic greeting; literally "Peace be upon you"; In addition,  means "and the Mercy of God and His blessing". The response to this greeting is  --"And on you be the Peace and Mercy of God and His Blessing".
 ʾAstaghfir allāh "I seek forgiveness from God." Islamic expression.
 Aʿudhu billah (ʾAʿūdhu billāh) "I seek refuge in God". This is a paraphrase on the beginnings of the two last suras in the Qur'an.
  Friends, protectors, helpers, caretaker, maintainer. (singular: wali)
   The parts of the body, male or female, must be covered in public but not between spouses, such as, body parts must be concealed of a woman before non-related men.(Non-related men means those she can marry lawfully).
 ʾĀyah, plural ʾāyāt  A sign. More specifically, a verse in the Qur'an.
 Āyatullāh (also spelled Ayatollah) Sign of God Title given to highly ranked religious scholars in Sh'ia sect. 

Azazīl : the proto Islamic name of iblīs (Potentially etymologically related to the name of a god/demon/daemon named azazel from the book of enoch). It is also believed to be his name before his banishment from heaven for not bowing down to Adam and Eve.

B
 Baiʿa See 
 Baatil see Bāṭil
 Baitullāh (baytu -llāh)  A mosque, literally "house of God". Specifically means the Ka'aba at Makkah (Mecca).
 Bakka'in a group known as the Weepers, who wept because they could not accompany Muhammad to Tabuk.
 Barakah  a form of blessing, thought derive from God and passed on others via prophets, angels and saints.
 Bārak Allāhu Fīkum may Allah bless you; response to expression of thanks.
 Barzakh Barrier. Used in the Qur'an to describe the barrier between sweet and salty water. In theology, the one-way barrier between the mortal realm and the spirit world which the deceased soul crosses and waits for qiyamah judgment.
 Bashar  humankind, mankind, man, human(s), etc.
   Insight, discernment, perceptivity, deep knowledge. Sometimes used by Sufis to denote the ability to directly perceive a transcendental Truth.
 Bāṭil void
 Bāṯin  The interior or hidden meaning. A person who devotes himself to studying such hidden meanings is a batini.
 B.B.H.N. Blessed be His Name – acronym for S.A.W.S. See P.B.U.H (Peace Be Upon Him).
   Innovation in religion, i.e. inventing new methods of worship. Bad Bidʿahs in Islam are considered a deviation and a serious sin by many Muslims.
 Bidʿah sayyiʾah Inquiry prohibited in Islam.
 Bismi-llāhi r-raḥmāni r-raḥīmi  "In the name of Allah, the Most Gracious, the Most Merciful".
 Burda  In general terms, it means a "cloak" or "outer garment". Specific reference is to the "burda" of Muḥammad (see Qaṣīda al-Burda).
   an oath of allegiance to a leader, traditionally the Caliph, a Sheikh or an Imam.

C
 Caliph khalīfah  literally successor; refers to the successor of Muhammad, the ruler of an Islamic theocracy.

D
 Dahri atheist – from the root ad dahr meaning time. In Islam, atheists are seen as those who think that time only destroys, hence the term ad dahriyyah or simply dahriya for the concept of atheism.
 Dajjāl  The Islamic equivalent of the Antichrist; means "liar" or "deceiver".
 Ḍallāl going astray.
 Dār al-ʿAhd  the Ottoman Empire's relationship with its Christian tributary states.
 Dār al-ʾAmn  means house of safety.
 Dār ad-daʿwa  a region where Islam has recently been introduced.
 Dār al-ḥarb means house of war; refers to areas outside Muslim rule which a Muslim state can go to war with 
 Dār al-Islām the abode, or land, of Islam.
 Dār al-Kufr  means domain of disbelief; the term originally refers to the Quraish-dominated society of Mecca between Mohammed's flight to Medina (the Hijra) and the city's conquest.
Dār aṣ-Ṣulḥ domain of agreement
 Dār ash-shahāda  See Dar al-Amn
 Darūd blessing
 Daʿwah  the call to Islam, proselytizing.
 Darwīš  an initiate of the Sufi Path, one who practices Sufism
 Dhikr  A devotional practice whereby the name of God is repeated in a rhythmical manner. Remembrance of God; spiritual exercise; Muslims believe that the primary function of prophets is to remind people of God. It is also pronounced zikr.
 Dhimmi (pl. dhimam)  "protected person"; Jews and Christians (and sometimes others, such as Buddhists, Sikhs, Hindus, and Zoroastrians), living in an Islamic state who must pay a separate tax (jizya) instead of the zakah paid by Muslims and this exempts non-Muslims from military service under Islamic law.
 Dhuhr (ẓuhr) the second obligatory daily prayer.
 Dīn  (literally 'religion') the way of life based on Islamic revelation; the sum total of a Muslim's faith and practice. Dīn is often used to mean the faith and religion of Islam.
 Diyyah "blood money", recompense for loss of a life.
 Duʿāʾ  personal prayer, supplication
 Dunya The physical Universe, as opposed to the Hereafter; sometimes spelled Dunia.

E
Eid al-Fitr
Marks the end of Ramaadaan [Ramzaan], the Islamic holy month of fasting (sawm).

Eid al-Adha 
Honours the willingness of Ibrahim to sacrifice his son Ismael as an act of obedience to God's command.

F
 Fadl divine grace
 Fajarah (also fujjār) Wicked evil doers. Plural of "fājir".
 fajr dawn, early morning, and the morning prayer. The time of the day when there is light in the horizon before sunrise.
  deliverance, salvation, well-being.
 Falsafah "philosophy" The methods and content of Greek philosophy which were brought into Islam. A person who tries to interpret Islam through rationalist philosophy was called a faylasuf, "philosopher".
   Sufi term meaning extinction – a spiritual death of the lower self (Nafs) with associated bad characteristics. Having no existence outside of God.
 Faqīh(pl. fuqahāʾ)()  One who has a deep understanding of Islam, its laws, and jurisprudence. (see fiqh)
 Al-Faraj the return of the Shia Mahdi
 , plural furūḍ  a religious duty, or an obligatory action: praying 5 times a day is fard Neglecting a fard will result in a punishment in the hereafter. (See wajib)
 Farḍ ʿain obligatory on every individual Muslim to aid in any way he can.
 Farḍ kifāyah an obligation on the Muslim community as a whole, from which some are freed if others take it up such as for jihad.
 Fāsid corrupt, invalid/violable (in Islamic finance)
 Fāsiq anyone who has violated Islamic law; usually refers to one whose character has been corrupted (plural "fāsiqūn"); in the Quran it refers to unbelievers who derided God for using similes and parables (in the Quran).
 Fātiḥa the short, opening sura of the Qur'an, which begins "In the name of God, the Merciful, the Compassionate. Praise be to God, the Lord of the Worlds..." These words hold an important place in Muslim liturgies and forms the core of the salat.
 Fatwā  a non-binding legal opinion of a scholar (alim). However, binding on him for those who follow his taqlid
 Fī ʾAmān allāh "In the protection of God". Said when a person departs. Cf. aman.
 Fiqh  jurisprudence built around the shariah by custom (al-urf). Literally means "deep understanding", refers to understanding the Islamic laws. (see faqih)
 Fī sabīl allāh for the sake of Allah; common Islamic expression for performing acts such as charity or Jihad 
 Fitna (pl. fitan)  trial or tribulation; also refers to any period of disorder, such as a civil war, or the period of time before the end of the world or any civil strife.
  innate disposition towards virtue, knowledge, and beauty. Muslims believe every child is born with fitrah.
 Furqān the criterion (of right and wrong, true and false); for example, the Qur'an as furqan.
 Fuwaysiqah vermin, evil from the root fasaqa meaning to deviate from the right way

G
 Ghafara (verb in past tense) to forgive, to cover up (sins). A characteristic of God.
 Ghaflah heedlessness, forgetfulness of God, indifference
 Ghayb the unseen, unknown.
 Ghanīmah spoils of war, booty.
 Gharar excessive uncertainty; also "the sale of what is not present" such as fish not yet caught, crops not yet harvested.
 Ghasbi  possessed unlawfully
 Ghāzi  (archaic) roughly, "raider": used for whose who participated in war. Later a title for veterans.
 Ghusl full ablution of the whole body (see wudu). Ghusl janaba is the mandatory shower after having sexual discharge.

H
Ḥadath akbar major ritual impurity which requires Niyyat for cleaning.
Ḥadath aṣghar  minor ritual impurity
Hādhā min faḍl rabbī Qur'anic expression and phrase meaning This is by the Grace of my Lord.
Hādī a guide, one who guides; A Muslim name for God is The Guide, or Al-Hadi.
Ḥadīth (ḥadīth) plural ahādīth  literally "speech"; recorded saying or tradition of Muhammad validated by isnad; with sira these comprise the sunnah and reveal shariah
 Ḥadīth mashhūr  Well-known hadith; a hadith which reported by one, two, or more Companions from Muhammad or from another Companion, but has later become well-known and transmitted by an indefinite number of people during the first and second generation of Muslims.
  someone who memorized the entire Qur'an. Literal translation = memorizer or Protector.
 Ḥaiḍ  menstruation
Ḥājj (ّ) plural Ḥujjāj and Ḥajīj Pilgrim, one who has made the Hajj.
Ḥajj (ّ) and Ḥijjah (plurals Ḥijjāt and Ḥijaj) pilgrimage to Mecca. Sunnis regard this as the fifth Pillar of Islam. See Dhu al-Hijjah.
Ḥajj at-Tamattuʿ performing ʿUmrah during the Hajj season, and on the Day of Tarwiah a pilgrim gets into the state of Ihram for Hajj. Before making ʿUmrah, approach the Miqat and declare the intention. End by sacrificing an animal.
Ḥajj al-Qirān  At Miqat, declare intention to perform both Hajj and 'Umrah together. After throwing the Jamrah of Al-'Aqabah, and getting hair shaved or cut that take off his Ihram garments and sacrifice animal.
Ḥajj al-ʾIfrād   At Miqat, declare intention for Hajj only. Maintain Ihram garments up to the Day of Sacrifice. No offering is required from him.
  a ruler's or governor's title; in some Muslim states, a judge. See Ahkam.
Ḥākimīya  sovereignty, governance.
  lawful, permitted, good, beneficial, free from sin praiseworthy, honourable. Doing a halal action won't result in punishment in the hereafter (See mustahabb, mandub)
Ḥalaqah  A gathering or meeting for the primary purpose of learning about Islam.
Ḥalq  Shaving of the head, particularly associated with pilgrimage to Mecca
  pre-Islamic non-Jewish or non-Christian monotheists. Plural: .
Ḥaqq (ّ) truth, reality, right, righteousness. Al-Haqq is one of 99 names of God.
  sinful
  sanctuary.
 Good, beautiful, admirable. Also a categorization of a hadith's authenticity as "acceptable". (other categorizations include authentic and fabricated).
 Hawa (pl. ʾahwāʾ)  Vain or egotistical desire; individual passion; impulsiveness.
Hidāyah  guidance from God.
  literally "cover". It describes the covering of the body for the purposes of modesty and dignity; broadly, a prescribed system of attitudes and behaviour regarding modesty and dignity. (See abayah, al-amira, burqa, chador, jilbab, khimar, milfeh, niqab, purdah, shayla)
Hijra  Muhammad and his followers' emigration from Mecca to Medina. Literally, "migration". This holiday marks the beginning of the Muslim New Year on the first day of the month of Muharram. See Rabi' al-awwal and abbreviation AH.
 Ḥikmah (also Hikmat)  Literally this means "wisdom" and refers to the highest possible level of understanding attainable by a Muslim. In particular, it refers to the illuminative, mystical sort of wisdom that a Gnostic or Sufi might attain.
Hilāl  Crescent moon. 
  wilderness reserve, protected forest, grazing commons; a concept of stewardship
  One half of a juz', or roughly 1/60th of the Qur'an
Hudā  Guidance.
Hudna  Truce. Cease-fire (often temporary)
 (sing. hadd)  Literally, limits or boundaries. Usually refers to limits placed by Allah on man; penalties of the Islamic law (sharia) for particular crimes described in the Qur'an – intoxication, theft, rebellion, adultery and fornication, false accusation of adultery, and apostasy. (See ta'zeer)
 ruling in the Qur'an or Sunnah. Also spelled Hukum.
Ḥūrī (pl. )  beautiful and pure young men and women that Muslims believe inhabit Paradise, or Heaven.

I
 submission, worship, but not limited to ritual: all expressions of servitude to Allah, including the pursuit of knowledge, living a pious life, helping, charity, and humility, can be considered ibadah.
ʾIblīs Devil banished to Hell for his arrogance and disobedience; aka Satan.
ʿId festival or celebration. Alternatively transliterated Eid.
 "the Festival of Sacrifice." The four-day celebration starting on the tenth day of Dhul-Hijja.
 "the Festival of Fitr (Breaking the fast)." A religious festival that marks the end of the fast of Ramadan.
 a meal eaten by Muslims breaking their fast after sunset during the month of Ramadan.
 state of consecration for hajj. Includes dress and or prayer.
 perfection in worship, such that Muslims try to worship God as if they see Him, and although they cannot see Him, they undoubtedly believe He is constantly watching over them.
 ʾIḥtiyāṭ Also Ahwat. A Precaution, either obligatory or optional.
 ʾIḥtiyāṭ mustaḥabb(ّ)  A preferred precaution.
 ʾIḥtiyāṭ wājib() An obligatory precaution.
ʾIʿjāz miracle, the character of the Qur'an in both form and content.
ʾIjāzah a certificate authorizing one to transmit a subject or text of Islamic knowledge
 the consensus of either the ummah (or just the ulema) – one of four bases of Islamic Law. More generally, political consensus itself. Shi'a substitute obedience to the Imam; opposite of ikhtilaf
ʾIjtihād During the early times of Islam, the possibility of finding a new solution to a juridical problem. Has not been allowed in conservative Islam since the Middle Ages. However, Liberal movements within Islam generally argue that any Muslim can perform ijtihad, given that Islam has no generally accepted clerical hierarchy or bureaucratic organization. The opposite of ijtihad is taqlid, Arabic for "imitation".
ʾIkhtilāf disagreement among the madhhabs (scholars) of a religious principle; opposite of ijma.
ʾIkrām honouring, hospitality, generosity – Dhul jalaali wal ikraam is one of the 99 names of Allah.
ʾIkrāh  mental or physical force.
ʾIlāh deity, a god; including gods worshiped by polytheists.
 all varieties of knowledge, usually a synonym for science
ʾImām literally, leader; e.g. a man who leads a community or leads the prayer; the Shi'a sect use the term only as a title for one of the twelve Allah-appointed successors of Muhammad.
ʾImāmah or imamate  successorship of Muhammad and the leadership of mankind.
ʾImān personal faith
ʾInna lilāhi wa ʾinna ʾilaihi rājiʿūn   To Allah we belong and to Him is our return – said to mourners
ʾInfāq the habitual inclination to give rather than take in life; the basis for charity
ʾInjīl Arabic term for the holy book called The Gospel said to have been given to Jesus, who is known as Isa in Arabic; Muslims believe the holy book has been corrupted and modified, and the New Testament gospels (Matthew, Mark, Luke, and John) are not the word of Allah, only Christian stories about Jesus.
ʾIn shāʾa -llāh "If God wills"; Inshallah is "resigned, accepting, neutral, passive. It is neither optimistic nor pessimistic." 
ʾIqāmah the second call to prayer. Similar to the azhan.
ʾIrtidād apostasy (see murtadd). Also riddah
 Jesus – 'Isa ibn Maryam (English: Jesus son of Mary), (a matronymic since he had no biological father). The Qur'an asserts that Allah has no sons and therefore, 'Isa is not the son of Allah. Muslims honor 'Isa as a nabi and rasul.
 night; the fifth salat prayer
ʾIṣlāḥ "reform". This term may mean very different things, depending on the context. When used in reference to reform of Islam, it may mean modernism, such as that proposed by Muhammad Abduh; or  Salafi literalism, such as that preached by Muhammad Nasiruddin al-Albani
ʾIslām   "submission to God". The Arabic root word for Islam means submission, obedience, peace, and purity.
ʾIsnād chain of transmitters of any given hadith
ʾIsrāʾ the night journey during which Muhammad (محمّد)is said to have visited Heaven. See miraj.
ʾIstighfār requesting forgiveness
ʾIstiḥādah vaginal bleeding except Haid and Nifas
ʾIstiṣlāḥ public interest – a source of Islamic Law.
ʾIstishhād martyrdom.
ʾIthm Negative reward for bad deeds that is tallied on qiyamah (judgment day.) Opposite of thawab.
ʾIʿtikāf seclusion in the masjid for the purpose of worship usually performed during the last 10 days of Ramadan.
ʾItmām al-hujjahclarification of truth in its ultimate form.
Ittaqullahcommand to fear God or to be pious to Allah.

J
 Jāʾiz That which is allowed or permissible. As a rule, everything that is not prohibited is allowed. (See halal, mustahabb, mandub)
Jahannam  the Hell-fire; Hell
Jāhilīyyah (الجاهليّة)  the time of ignorance before Islam was realized. Describes polytheistic religions.
Jahl  ignorance, foolishness.
Jalsa  sitting.
  "gathering"; i.e. a university, a mosque, or more generally, a community or association.
Janābah  A state of spiritual impurity that occur due to sexual intercourse or ejaculation and necessitates major ritual ablution (ghusl),
 Janāzah  Funeral. Ṣalāt al-Janāzah is a funeral prayer.
Jannah  Paradise, Heaven, the Garden
 Jazāka-llāhu khayran  "May God reward you with good." Islamic expression of gratitude.
Jihād  struggle. Any earnest striving in the way of God, involving personal, physical, for righteousness and against wrongdoing;
Jihād aṣ-ṣaghīr  Offensive jihad declared by caliph.
Jihād aṭ-ṭalab Offensive jihad.
Jihād ad-dafʿa  Defensive jihad.
Jihād bil-māl Financial jihad.
Jilbāb  (pl. jalabib) a long, flowing, garment worn by some as a more conservative means of fulfillment of sartorial hijab. (See also: abaya. burka, chador)
Jinn (ّ)  A term referring to invisible beings, also the name of specific type of unseen creatures capable of salvation.
Jizya A tax specified in the Quran (9:29) to be paid by non-Muslim males living under Muslim political control.
Juḥod  To deny. Jaahid (the denier). Disbelief out of rejection. When there comes to them that which they [should] have recognized, they refuse to believe in (kafaru) it. ( 2:89) Accordingly, juhud includes rejection (kufr at-taktheeb) and resistance (kufr al-'inaad)
  Friday prayer or Sabbath.
Juzʾ  one of thirty parts of the Qur'an.

K
  cube-house; i.e., the cube-shaped building in Mecca which Muslims face to pray.
Kāfir - non-Muslim (kāfir sing.; كفّار kuffār pl.)  from the word kafara, "to hide." Those who deliberately hide the truth; non-Muslims in Islamic or non-Islamic countries or states, unbelievers, truth-concealers; one who is ungrateful to God as per Islam. Common derogatory term used by different Islamic factions such as sunni and shias to denounce each other as non-Muslims. Plural: Kāfirūn. Commonly used as an offensive term for black people by white South Africans.
Kalām (ʿilm al-kalām)  Literally, "words" or "speech," and referring to oration. The name applied to the discipline of philosophy and theology concerned specifically with the nature of faith, determinism and freedom, and the nature of the divine attributes.
 Khair Every kind of good
 Khalīfah  Caliph, more generally, one performing the duties of khilafa.
 Khalīl  devoted friend
 Khalq  Creation – the act of measuring; determining, estimating and calculating. Khalq is the noun form of the verb khalaqa (see bara, sawwara).
 Al-khāliq The Creator, Allah.
Khamr Intoxicant, wine.
 the speaker at the Friday Muslim prayer, or Jumu'ah prayer.
 Khatm to finish - refers to the complete recitation of the Qur'an.
Kharāj  a land tax.
Khayr  goodness. See birr (righteousness) See qist (equity) See 'adl (equilibrium and justice) See haqq (truth and right) See ma'ruf (known and approved) See taqwa (piety.)
khilāf Controversy, dispute, discord.
Khilāfah  Man's trusteeship and stewardship of Earth; Most basic theory of the Caliphate; Flora and fauna as sacred trust; Accountability to; God for harms to nature, failure to actively care and maintain. Three specific ways in which khalifa is manifested in Muslim practice are the creation of haram to protect water, hima to protect other species (including those useful to man), and by resisting infidel domination over Muslim lands, in jihad.
Khilwa,  An offense consisting of being caught alone in private with a member of the opposite sex who is not an immediate family member.
 al-khulafāʾ ar-rāshidūn  four first caliphs, believed by most Muslims to be most righteous rulers in history
Khimār (pl. khumur or ʾakhmirah)  headcovering (Q. 24:31).
Khitān  Male circumcision.
Khuluq pl. ʾakhlāq  ethics
 Khushūʿ humility, devotion, concentration (especially in prayer).
 the sermon at Jumu'ah prayer.
 Kibr  pride, arrogance
 Kibar  old age
 Kitāb  book; The Qurʾān is often referred to as "Al-Kitāb" (The Book).
Kufr  Unbelief, infidelity, blasphemy; also hubris. See Kafir and Kuffar
 Kufr al-ḥukm  Disbelief from judgment.
 Kufr al-ʿInād  Disbelief out of stubbornness
 Kufr al-ʾInkār  Disbelief out of arrogance and pride.
 Kufr al-ʾIstibdāl  Disbelief because of trying to substitute Allah's Laws.
 Kufr al-ʾIstiḥlāl  Disbelief out of trying to make HARAM into HALAL.
 Kufrul-Istihzaha  Disbelief due to mockery and derision
 Kufr al-jahl Disbelief from not being aware of or not understanding.
 Kufr al-juhud Disbelief from obstinacy after being presented with truth.
 Kufr an-Nifāq Disbelief out of hypocrisy.
 Kufr al-ʾIʿrāḍ  Disbelief due to avoidance.
Kun  God's command to the universe, 'Be!' is sufficient to create it.

L
Lā ilāha illā-llāh  "There is no god but God." The most important expression in Islam. It is part of the first pillar of Islam. According to Islam, this is the message of all the Prophets, such as Abraham, Moses, Jesus and Muhammad.
 Labbayka -llāhumma  God, I obey you (said during hajj)
 Laghw  Dirty, false, evil vain talk
  Curse, execration, or imprecation.
Laylat al-Qadr  the Night of Power, towards the end of Ramadan, when Muhammad received the first revelation of the Qur'an.

M
Madhhab  pl. Madhāhib school of religious jurisprudence (fiqh), school of thought. Also see fiqh.
Madrasah  school, university
Maghrib the fourth daily salat prayer
Mahdi  "a guide". More specifically al-Mahdi (the guide) is a figure who will appear with Prophet Jesus before the end of time, when God allows it, to bring world peace, order and justice, after it has been overcome with injustice and aggression.
Mahdūr ad-damm he whose blood must be wasted
Maḥram  a relative of the opposite gender usually described as being "within the forbidden limits"; a better description is "within the protected limits". means relatives who one can appear before without observing hijab and who one cannot marry.
Maisir  gambling, game of chance
Makrūh  Means "detested", though not haraam (forbidden); something that is disliked or offensive. If a person commits the Makruh, he does not accumulate ithim but avoiding the Makhruh is rewarded with thawab.
  angels (Sing. Malak). Belief in angels is one of the Five Pillars of Islam and requiered for Muslims to believe in.
Mā malakat ʾaymānukum  one's rightful spouse (literally: what your right hands possess)
Manāsik  the rules specifying the requirements of a legally valid hajj
Mandūb  commendable or recommended. Failure to do it would not be a sin. (See halal mustahabb)
 the methodology by which truth is reached
Mansūkh  That which is abrogated. The doctrine of al-Nasikh wal-Mansukh (abrogation) of certain parts of the Qur'anic revelation by others. The principle is mentioned in the Qur'an (2:106) see naskh
Manzil one of seven equal parts of the Qur'an
  consensus of the community
 sing. maqṣid  goals or purposes; such as the purposes of Islamic law
Maṣāliḥ sing. maṣlaḥah public interests
Masbuq (مَسْبُوق) A person who is late for salat and has not joined the imam in the first rak’at.
Mā shāʾa -llāh  Allah has willed it
  the (Biblical) Messiah, Jesus Christ
Masjid pl. masājid,  place of prayer; mosque
Masjid al-Ḥarām  the mosque surrounding the Kaʿbah in Mecca.
 or  Non-Arab Muslims
Mawlā [mawlan] [pl. mawālin (ٍ)]  protector or master
Mawlānā  an Arabic word meaning "our master" (not literally). It is used mostly as a title preceding the name of a respected religious leader, in particular graduates of religious institutions. The term is sometimes used to refer to Rumi.
Maulvi  an honorific Islamic religious title often, but not exclusively, given to Muslim religious scholars or Ulema preceding their names. Maulvi generally means any religious cleric or teacher
Mecca ( Makkah)  the holiest city in Islam
Medina (Madīnah)  "city"; Medinat-un-Nabi means "the City of the Prophet." See Hijra (Islam)
Mi'ād the Resurrection; God will resurrect all of humankind to be judged. Shi'as regard this as the fifth Pillar of Islam.
Miḥrāb  a niche in the wall of all mosques, indicating the direction of prayer
Millah In Arabic, millah means "religion," but it has only been used to refer to religions other than Islam, which is din.
Millet (see Millah) (Turkish word also meaning a nation, community, or a people). In an Islamic state, "Ahl al Kitab" may continue to practice their former religion in a semi-autonomous community termed the millet.
Minaret  a tower built onto a mosque from the top of which the call to prayer is made
Minbar  a raised pulpit in the mosque where the Imam stands to deliver sermons
Minhaj  methodology, e.g. methods, rules, system, procedures.
Mīqāt  intended place
Miʿrāj  the Ascension to the Seven Heavens during the Night Journey (See also: Al-Isra)
Muʾadhdhin a person who performs the call to prayer
Mosque  a Muslim place of worship.
Muʿāhadāt  treaties
  suras Al-Falaq and an-Nas, the "Surahs of refuge", should be said to relieve suffering (also protect from Black Magic)
  literally permissible; neither forbidden nor commended. Neutral. (See halal)
Mubaligh  person who recites Qur'an
Muftī  an Islamic scholar who is an interpreter or expounder of Islamic law (Sharia), capable of issuing fatawa (plural of "fatwa").
Muḥajjabah  woman who wears hijab.
Muḥkamāt  unequivocal verses of Qur'an. (See mutashabehat.)
Muḥāribah  a person who wages war against God
Muḥammadun rasūl allāh  "Muhammad is the messenger of God." This statement is the second part of the first pillar of Islam. This is the second most important statement in Islam.
Mufsid  evil-doer a person who spreads corruption not in accordance with Islam. Plural mufsideen.
Muḥsin  a person who performs good deed. Plural muhsineen. Opposite of Mufsidun.
Muhājirūn  The first Muslims that accompanied Muhammad when he traveled to Medina.
Muharṭiq  heretic.
Mujāhid  a fighter for Islam. Plural Mujāhidūn.
Mujtahid  a scholar who uses reason for the purpose of forming an opinion or making a ruling on a religious issue. Plural: Mujtahidun.
Mullah   are Islamic clergy. Ideally, they should have studied the Qur'an, Islamic traditions (hadith), and Islamic law (fiqh).
Muʾmin  A Muslim who observes the commandments of the Qur'an.
Munāfiq  hypocrite. Plural: Munafiqun
Muntaiabah pl. muntaqibāt  woman who wears niqab
Murābaḥah  a type of sharia-compliant mortgage (see Ijara)
Murshid  a Sufi teacher
Murtadd female apostate is Murtaddah apostate (see irtidad see mahdur ad-damm.)
Muṣḥaf a copy, codex or redaction of the Qur'an.
Mushrik(pl. mushrikūn) One who associates others in worship with God; a polytheist.
Muslim  a follower of the religion of Islam. One who submits their will to God (Allah)
 (ّ)  commendable or recommended. (See halal, mandub)
Mutʿah  literally enjoyment; compensation paid to a divorced woman; when used in the phrase nikāḥ al-mutʿah it refers to temporary marriage that is practiced in Twelver Shia Islam.
Mutashābihāt equivocal verses of Qur'an. (See Muhakkamat.)
Mutaʿaṣṣibūn  fanatics
Muṭawwaʿ plural muṭawwaʿūn  religious man in certain regions, a volunteer teacher
Muṭawwaʿūn (singular muṭawwaʿ) Religious police.
Mutawātir  "agreed upon"—used to describe hadith that were narrated by many witnesses through different narration chains (isnads) leading back to Muhammad

N
Nabī  literally, prophets. In the Islamic context, a Nabi is a man sent by God to give guidance to man, but not given scripture. The Prophet Abraham was a Nabi. This is in contrast to Rasul, or Messenger. Plural: Anbiya. See: Rasul.
Nafs  soul, the lower self, the ego/id
Nāfilah  An optional, supererogatory practice of worship, in contrast to farida
Najāsah Impurity
 Nājis impure
Nakīr and Munkar  two angels who test the faith of the dead in their graves
Namaz Ritual Prayer in Turkish and Persian language.
Naṣīḥa  advice
Naskh  The doctrine of al-Nasikh wal-Mansukh (abrogation) of certain parts of the Qur'anic revelation by others. The principle is mentioned in the Qur'an (2:106) see mansukh.
Naṣṣ (ّ)  a known, clear legal injunction
 Nifās the bleeding after childbirth (see Haid)
Nifāq falsehood; dishonesty; hypocrisy
Nihāļ  Nihal is an Arabic name meaning "joyful."
Nikāḥ the matrimonial contract between a bride and bridegroom within Islamic marriage
Niqāb  veil covering the face
Niyyah intention
Nubūwwah  prophethood. Shi'a regard this as the third Pillar of Islam.
 Nukrah a great munkar – prohibited, evil, dreadful thing.
 Nūr  Light, more theological connoted than daw, the proper term for light in Arabic. Nur is often associated with benevolence, as Light of Muhammad and angels of mercy as created from nur. The term is closely associated with nar, which denotes the burning light of fire, often associated with fierce forces, like angels of punishment, demons and hell.

P
 P.B.U.H.  an acronym that stands for "peace be upon him" a blessing which is affixed to Muhammad's name whenever it is written. In some circles and English writings, Sufis regard PBUH to signify "Peace and Blessings Upon Him" (the Rasul or Messenger of Allah). These are the primary English explications of the P.B.U.H. acronym. The Arabic version is S.A.W.

Q
Qadhf false imputation of unchastity specifically punished by sharia.
Qadar  predestination.
Qāḍī  judge of Islamic Law
Qalb  Heart, considered the center of the self in Islamic anthropology
Qiblah  the direction Muslims face during prayer
 Qitāl fī sabīl allāh  fight in the cause of Allah.
Qiyāmah resurrection; return of the dead for the Day of Judgment
  equitable retribution – a fine for murder if the heirs forgive the perpetrator. (See hudud, tazeer)
Qiyām  to stand, a position of salat prayer
Qiyās  analogy – foundation of legal reasoning and thus fiqh
Qudsī  classification of a hadith that are believed to be narrated by Muhammad from God.
Qurbah  closeness to God. Term is associated with Sufism.
Qurʾān  The word Qur'an means recitation. Muslims believe the Qur'an (Koran) to be the literal word of God and the culmination of God's revelation to mankind, revealed to Muhammad in the year AD 610 in the cave Hira by the angel Jibril.

R

Rabb (ّ) Lord, Sustainer, Cherisher, Master.R. A., raḍiya -llāhu ʿanhu: May Allah be pleased with him. Variants are ʿanhā (her) and ʿanhum (them).
Raḥmān Merciful; Ar-Rahman means "The Most Merciful"
Raḥīm compassionate; Ar-Rahim means "The Most Compassionate" as in the Basmala
Raḥimaḥullāh May Allah have mercy on him. Usually used after mentioning the companions of Muhammad
Raḥmatullāh Mercy of Allah. Sometimes used as an alternative to Rahimahullah after mentioning a righteous person by saying, rahmatullahi ʿilayh: Mercy of Allah be upon him/her
Rajm  stoning or banishment, used as an epithet for devils in some Islamic prayers.
Rakʿah  one unit of Islamic prayer, or Salat. Each daily prayer is made up of a different number of raka'ah.
Ramaḍān  month of fasting when the Qur'an was first revealed. Spelt as Ramzaan, Ramadhan, or Ramathan as well.
 Rāshidūn  Sunnis consider the first four caliphs as the "orthodox" or "rightly guided" caliphs. They were Abu Bakr, 'Umar, 'Uthman and 'Ali.
Rasūl messenger; Unlike prophets (Nabi), messengers are given scripture. Moses, David, Jesus and Mohammed are considered messengers. All messengers are considered prophets, but not all prophets are given scripture. See: Nabi.
Riba  interest, the charging and paying of which is forbidden by the Qur'an
Ribat  Guarding Muslims from infidels
Riddah apostasy, in which a person abandons Islam for another faith or no faith at all.
Risālah literally, message or letter. Used both in common parlance for mail correspondences, and in religious context as divine message.
Rūḥ spirit; the divine breath which God blew into the clay of Adam. Sometimes used interchangeable with nafs; otherwise distinguished and identified with the sublime parts of human's soul.
Rukn plural ʾArkān  means what is inevitable. One of the five pillars of Islam. (See fard, wajib)
Rukūʿ  the bowing performed during salat.

S
Sabb blasphemy: insulting God (sabb Allah) or Muhammad (sabb ar-rasūl or sabb an-nabī).
 patience, endurance, self-restraint
Ṣadaqah charity; voluntary alms above the amount for zakat.
Ṣaḥābah (sing. Ṣāḥib) companions of Muhammad. A list of the best-known Companions can be found at List of companions of Muhammad.
Ṣāḥīḥ  "Sound in isnad." A technical attribute applied to the "isnad" of a hadith.
Sakīnah  divine "tranquility" or "peace" which descends upon a person when the Qur'an is recited.
Salaf  (righteous) predecessors/ancestors. In Islam, Salaf is generally used to refer to the first three generations of Muslims. Anyone who died after this is one of the khalaf or "latter-day Muslims".
Salafism a reform movement, basing Islamic teachings on Quran and Sunnah alone. Contrary to Classical Sunnism, it disregards former established consensus and the opinions of the Sahaba.
Ṣalāt sala(t) any one of the daily five obligatory prayers. Sunnis regard this as the second Pillar of Islam
 Salaat al-Istikharah Prayer for guidance is done in conjunction with two rakaahs of supererogatory prayer.
Salām  peace (see sulh)
Sallallahu alayhi wa sallam  "May Allah bless him and grant him peace." The expression should be used after stating Muhammad's name. See abbreviation: S.A.W. or S.A.W.S. also P.B.U.H.Ṣamad  eternal, absolute; Muslims believe Allah is "The Eternal."
Salsabīl a river in heaven (al-firdaus)
 Sawa  awakening, revival
 S.A.W. (or S.A.W.S.)  Sallallahu alayhi wa sallam. See P.B.U.H.  fasting during the month of Ramadhan. The word sawm is derived from Syriac sawmo.
Sayyid  (in everyday usage, equivalent to 'Mr.') a descendant of a relative of Muhammad, usually via Husayn.
Sema  refer to some of the ceremonies used by various Sufi orders
Shahādah  The testimony of faith: La ilaha illa Allah. Muhammadun rasulullah. ("There is no god but Allah. Muhammad is the messenger of Allah."). Sunnis regard this as the first Pillar of Islam. Also may be used as a synonym for the term Istish'hād meaning martyrdom.
Shahīd pl. shuhadāʾ  witness, martyr. Usually refers to a person killed whilst fighting in "jihād fī sabīl Allāh" (jihad for the sake of Allah). Often used in modern times for deaths in a political cause (including victims of soldiers, deaths in battle, et cetera) which are viewed by some Muslims as a spiritual cause not just a political cause. But the real meaning of Jihad is to defend Islam in any way; thus, it could be in an economic way or could refer to fighting for the rights of the oppressed or the believers; most often it refers to mastering one's own inclination for evil and shirk.
Shaykh  a spiritual master, Muslim clergy
  "the path to a watering hole"; Islamic law; the eternal ethical code and moral code based on the Qur'an, Sunnah, Ijma, and Qiyas; basis of Islamic jurisprudence (fiqh)
Sharīf  a title bestowed upon the descendants of Muhammad through Hasan, son of his daughter Fatima Zahra and son-in-law Ali ibn Abi Talib
Shayṭān  Evil being; a devil. With the article Al- it designates Satan (Iblis) in particular. In plural, it designates an indefined host of evil spirits; demons. Also applied to evil humans and evil jinn.
 A branch of Islam who believe in Imam Ali and his sons (Hassan and Hussayn) as custodians of Islam by the will of Mohammed.
Shirk  idolatry; polytheism; the sin of believing in any divinity except God and of associating other gods with God.
Shūrā  consultation
 Majlis ash-shūrā  advisory council in a Caliphate
Sidrat al-Muntaha a lotus tree that marks the end of the seventh heaven, the boundary where no creation can pass.
 Sīrah  life or biography of Muhammad; his moral example – with hadith this comprises the sunnah
aṣ-Ṣirāṭ al-mustaqīm  the Straight Path
Subah Sadiq  true dawn
 Subḥānahu wa taʿāla(abbreviated S.W.T.)  expression used following written name or vocalization of Allah in Arabic meaning highly praised and glorified is He.
 Subḥān allāh  "Glory to God" – this phrase is often used when praising God or exclaiming awe at His attributes, bounties, or creation.
  a Muslim mystic; See: Sufism (tasawwuf).
Suḥūr  the meal eaten by fasting Muslims just before dawn.
Sujūd() kneeling down, a position of salat.
Ṣukūk bond that generates revenue from sales, profits, or leases rather than interest.
Ṣulḥ  A condition of peace, an armistice, or treaty. It is related to the word muṣālaḥah which means peace, conciliation, or compromise.
Sunnah or sunnat an-Nabī  the "path" or "example" of Muhammad, i.e., what he did or said or agreed to during his life. He is considered by Muslims to be the best human moral example. Also referring to optional good deeds, such as pious deeds and voluntary ritual prayers.
Sunni  the largest denomination of Islam. The word Sunni comes from the word Sunnah, which means the words and actions or example of the Islamic Prophet Muhammad.
Sūrah  chapter; the Qur'an is composed of 114 suras

T
Taʿāla Almighty
Tābiʿīn followers of the Ṣaḥābah
Tafsīr exegesis, particularly such commentary on the Qur'an
Ṭāghūt (taghout) "false god" or idol; also tyranny.
Tahajjud optional (supererogatory), late-night (pre-dawn) prayer
Ṭahārah purification from ritual impurities by means of wudu or ghusl
Ṭāhir pure, ritually clean
Tahlīl  Uttering the formula of faith: "Lā ilāha illā -llāh", (i.e. "There is no god but God");Tahmid:Tahmid means to praise Allah or saying "Alhamdillah".It derives from the same root ase Muhammad, mahmud and hamid(hmd) which means praise in Arabic.
Taḥnīk 'Tahnik' is an Islamic ceremony of touching the lips of a newborn baby with honey, sweet juice or pressed dates.
 corruption, forgery. Muslims believe the Bible Scriptures were corrupted but the Qur'an is in its original form.
Tajdīd to purify and reform society in order to move it toward greater equity and justice, literally meaning to make new in present tense
Tajdīf blasphemy
Tajwīd a special manner of reciting the Qur'an according to prescribed rules of pronunciation and intonation.
Takāful Based on sharia Islamic law, it is a form of mutual insurance. See retakaful.
Takbīr a proclamation of the greatness of Allah; a Muslim invocation.
takhsis  (also takhsees) in fiqh, a qualification of a general ruling [aam]  so that it only applies in certain cases.
Takfīr declaration of individual or group of previously considered Muslim as kaffir.
Takhrīj The science of hadith extraction and authentication, including validation of chains of transmitters of a hadith by this science's scholars and grading hadith validity.
Takweeni Ontological
Ṭalāq divorce
Taqalan accountable ones; those who are responsible for their deeds. Among them are the human and the jinn.
Taqdīr  fate, predestination
Taqlīd to follow the scholarly opinion of one of the four Imams of Islamic Jurisprudence.
Taqīyyah 'precaution', that one is allowed to hide his true beliefs in certain circumstances or to lie to save himself of being killed or harmed.
Taqwa righteousness; goodness; Piety: Taqwa is taken from the verbe Ittaqua, which means Avoiding, Fearing the punishment from Allah for committing sins. It is piety obtained by fearing the punishment of Allah.
Tarāwīḥ extra prayers in Ramadan after the Isha prayer.
Tarkīb the study of Arabic grammar issued from the Qur'an
 a Muslim religious order, particularly a Sufi order
Tartīl slow, meditative recitation of the Qur'an
Taṣawwuf or Sufism
Tasbīḥ  Uttering the formula: "Subhan Allah", i.e. (Glory be to Allah)
Taṣdīq "the evaluation of the degree of iman" (belief), "proof of iman; Tasdiq is proved by "acceptance of what the prophets brought down"; by Islamic works and deeds "which in turn are used to evaluate the level of iman".
Tashkīl vocalization of Arabic text by means of diacritical marks. An integral part of the Arabic writing system. Literally meaning to form or arrange
Taslīm salutation at the end of prayer
Taṭbīr Shia Ashura ceremony of self-flagellation by hitting head with sword. 
Tawafuq God-conscious understanding of a phenomenon.
Tawakkul total reliance on Allah.
Tawassul asking Allah Almighty through the medium and intercession of another person.
Ṭawāf circumambulating the Ka'bah during Hajj.
Tawfiq Divine help in getting to the purpose to one who deserves.
Tawbah repentance
Tawḥīd monotheism; affirmation of the Oneness of Allah. Muslims regard this as the first part of the Pillar of Islam, the second part is accepting Muhammad as rasoul (messenger). The opposite of Tawheed is shirk
Ta'weel explanation and elucidation, how something will occur and its result, or figurative interpretation.
Tawrāh the Torah as revealed to Musa (Moses.)
Ṭayyib all that is good as regards things, deeds, beliefs, persons, foods, etc. Means "pure." The Shahaddath is tayyib.
 Taʿzīr Discretionary punishment – a sentence or punishment whose measure is not fixed by the Shari'ah. (See hudud, qisas)
Tazkīyah Purification of the Soul.
 Thawāb Reward for good deeds that is tallied on qiyamah (judgment day.) Opposite of ithim.
 Tilāwah ritual recitation of passages of the Qur'an.
 Ṭumaʾnīnah  state of motionlessness, calm

U
ʿUbūdīyah  worship
ʾUḍḥīyah sacrifice
 or ulema the leaders of Islamic society, including teachers, Imams and judges. Singular alim.
ʾUmmah or umma (literally 'nation') the global community of all Muslim believers
  the lesser pilgrimage performed in Mecca. Unlike hajj,  can be performed throughout the year.
 ʿUqūbah  the branch of sharia that deals with punishment. (See hudud, qisas, tazeer)
  custom of a given society, leading to change in the fiqh
 ʾUṣūl (sing. ʾaṣl)()  Principles, origins.
ʾUṣūl al-Fiqh  the study of the origins and practice of Islamic jurisprudence (fiqh)

W
 Wa ʿalaykum as-salām Wa 'Alaykum as-Salaam!, meaning "and upon you be peace". (see As-Salamu Alaykum)
 Wafāt death. (Barah-wafat) Muhammad was born on the twelfth day of Rabi-ul-Awwal, the third month of the Muslim year. His death anniversary also falls on the same day, the word 'barah' standing for the twelve days of Muhammad's sickness.
  "unity of being". Philosophical term used by some Sufis. Related to fanaa
Waḥy  revelation of God to His prophets for all humankind
Wahn  literal meaning is "weakness" or "feebleness". According to one hadith, Muhammad explained it as "love of the world and dislike of death"
Wājib  obligatory or mandatory see fard
Walī  friend, protector, guardian, supporter, helper
 Waqf  An endowment of money or property: the return or yield is typically dedicated toward a certain end, for example, to the maintenance of the poor, a family, a village, or a mosque. Plural: awqaf
Warrāq  traditional scribe, publisher, printer, notary and book copier
Wasaṭ  the middle way, justly balanced, avoiding extremes, moderation
 Wasīlah  the means by which one achieves nearness to Allah (see tawassul )
Witr  a voluntary, optional night prayer of odd numbers rakaats.
Wuḍūʾ  ablution for ritual purification from minor impurities before salat (see ghusl)

Y
Yā Allāh  O, God!
Ya Rasūl Allāh  O, Messenger of God!. Term used by companions when interacting with Muhammad.
Yaʾjūj wa-Maʾjūj Ya'jūj wa-Ma'jūj is the Islamic counterpart of Gog and Magog
Yaqīn  certainty, that which is certain
 Yarḥamuk-Allāh "May God have mercy on you", said when someone sneezes; the same as "(God) bless you" in English
 Allāh Yarḥamuhu, fem. yarḥamuhā() "May God have mercy of his/her soul", (said when someone dies)
 Yawm ad-Dīn  Day of Reckoning, Awe
 Yawm al-Ghaḍab  Day of Rage, Wrath
Yawm al-Qiyāmah  "Day of the Resurrection"; Day of Judgement

Z
Zabūr  the Psalms revealed to King Daoud (David) 
 Zabīḥa (Dhabīḥah) see dhabiha  Islamic method of slaughtering an animal, required for the meat to be halal. Using a sharp knife, the animal's windpipe, throat, and blood vessels of the neck are severed without cutting the spinal cord to ensure that the blood is thoroughly drained before removing the head.
Ẓāhir()  Exterior meaning
Zaidi  Islamic sub-sect of Shi'ah, popularly found in Yemen, with similarities to Sunni
Zakāt, Al-Māl  tax, alms, tithe as a Muslim duty; Sunnis regard this as the fourth Pillar of Islam. Neither charity nor derived from Islamic economics, but a religious duty and social obligation.
Zakāt al-Fiṭr Charity given at the end of Ramadan.
Ẓālimūn  polytheists, wrong-doers, and unjust.
Zandaqa heresy
Zināʾ  sexual activity outside of marriage (covering the English words adultery and fornication)
Zindīq  heretic, atheist
Zulfiqar (Dhu-l-fiqār)  Sword of Ali, presented to him by Muhammad
Zuhr  midday islamic prayer

Explanatory notes 
 Arabic words are created from three-letter "roots" which convey a basic idea. For example, k-t-b conveys the idea of writing. Addition of other letters before, between, and after the root letters produces many associated words: not only "write" but also "book", "office", "library", and "author". The abstract consonantal root for Islam is s-l-m.
The English word algorithm is derived from the name of the inventor of algebra; similarly Arabic words like alchemy, alcohol, azimuth, nadir, zenith and oasis, which mean the same as in English. Arabic numerals are what we use in English ("0", "1", "2",...) 
 Some Islamic concepts are usually referred to in Persian or Turkic. Those are typically of later origin than the concepts listed here; for completeness it may be best to list Persian terms and those unique to Shi'a on their own page, likewise Turkic terms and those unique to the Ottoman period on their own page, as these are culturally very distinct.
 The word "crusade" in English is usually translated in Arabic as "ḥamlah ṣalībīyah" which means literally "campaign of Cross-holders" (or close to that meaning). In Arabic text it is "" and the second word comes from "ṣalīb" which means "cross."

See also 

 99 Names of God
 Arabic Ontology
 History of Islam
 Islamic eschatology
 List of Christian terms in Arabic
 List of English words of Arabic origin
 Prophets of Islam

References

Further reading
 Suzanne Haneef, What Everyone Should Know about Islam and Muslims, (Kazi Publications, Chicago), popular introduction
 Muzaffar Haleem, The Sun is Rising In the West, (Amana Publications, Beltsville, MD 1999).
 Ziauddin Sardar, Muhammad for Beginners, Icon Books, 1994, some fun, from very modern Sufi point of view.
 Hans Wehr, A Dictionary of Modern Written Arabic (Spoken Language Services, Ithaca, NY, 1976). ed. J. Milton Cowan. .
 Islam in the World by Malise Ruthven (Gantra Publications, 2006)

External links
 Voiced Dictionary of Islamic and Arabic Key Words
 Glossary of Islamic terms

Arabic words and phrases
Islam
Islam-related lists
 
Wikipedia glossaries using description lists